Seer the Movie 3: Heroes Alliance (Chinese: 赛尔号大电影3之战神联盟) is a 2013 Chinese animated adventure film directed by Wang Zhangjun and Yin Yuqi and based on an online game. The film is part of a film series, being preceded by Seer 2 (2012) and followed by Seer 4 (2014). It was released on 12 July 2013.

Roles 
Left is traditional Chinese and Right is Simplied Chinese

Heroes alliance 
Ray(雷伊, 雷伊)

Gaia(蓋亞, 盖亚)

Cassius(卡修斯, 卡修斯)

Blacke(布萊克, 布莱克)

Miris(米瑞斯, 米瑞斯)

Cast
Yang Ou
Zhang Anqi
Fan Junhang
Su Xin
Jia Zhichao
Liu Qin
Xia Lei
Yang Menglu
Meng Xianglong
You Jun

Reception
The film grossed ¥76.3 million in China.

References

External links

2013 animated films
2013 films
2010s adventure films
Animated adventure films
Animated films based on video games
Chinese animated films
Chinese children's films